The B8444S is an automobile V8 engine developed by Yamaha Motor Corporation for Volvo Cars. It was built in Japan and based on Volvo designs.

Usage
Volvo began offering a  V8 engine in its large P2 platform automobiles in 2005 -  It was initially offered only for the Volvo XC90 but later found its way in the second generation Volvo S80, and was mated to a six speed Aisin Seiki AWTF80-SC transmission of Japan also with a Swedish Haldex all wheel drive system AWD. The 4.4 L V8 Volvo engine was built by Yamaha in Japan under Volvo design and specifications.

Although the B8444S shares its Yamaha origination, its transverse layout, and its 60 degree bank angle, officials of all three companies involved insist that the Volvo V8 is not related to the SHO engine; the die-cast open-deck aluminum Volvo block is clearly different from the sand-cast closed-deck aluminum SHO engine block although the two engines share many common dimensions including bore centers, stroke, bearing journal diameters, and deck height.

The engine also features a MoTeC M190 and Injector Dynamics ID725 electronic fuel injection. The Noble unit is custom built by a 3rd party firm expressly for Noble Cars UK.
It uses an Oerlikon Graziano transaxle six-speed manual gearbox.

Volvo discontinued the engine subsequent to its change in ownership and management in August, 2010. The new management intends to offer a single engine across all Volvo models, ultimately a four cylinder, and at that point Volvo Cars was owned by Ford.

Specification
As a Volvo V8, this new engine uses the similar Volvo engine naming system. The engine is called the Volvo B8444S. B being for bensin (gasoline), 8 for the number of cylinders, 4.4 for the total displacement of the engine, the last 4 for the number of valves per cylinder and S for suction, meaning it's naturally aspirated. This engine also uses original Volvo parts.

It has a 60 degree cylinder bank. The engine block and heads are cast from aluminium reducing its weight to a comparatively light .

To retain its 90 degree firing interval with its 60 degree bank angle and cross plane crankshaft the b8444s utilised offset crank journals.

Originally debuted in the Volvo XC90, which previously used 5- or 6-cylinder transverse inline engines, the B8444S had a number of significant packaging challenges to overcome. To save space and enable transverse orientation, the alternator is mounted directly to the engine block without brackets, The exhaust camshafts are linked to the intake camshafts with smaller secondary chains, and the left-hand cylinder bank is offset from its counterpart by half a cylinder's width. These tactics resulted in what was, at the time, the most compact V8 for its given 4.4 L displacement.

The B8444S also made strides in emissions standards as the first V8 engine to meet the Ultra-low-emission vehicle (ULEV II) standard. The emissions standards were met using a combination of four catalytic converters and continuous variable valve timing.

Motorsport
A 5.0 L version was developed for use in Volvo S60s by Garry Rogers Motorsport in the V8 Supercars series between 2014 and 2016.

Marine
The engine block is also used for the Yamaha F300V8, F350V8, and XTO Offshore outboards. The displacement ranges from 5.3 to 5.6 litres.

The heads are also modified to “reverse flow” types where the inlet ports are on the outside of the engine, and the exhaust ports exit in towards the Vee of the engine. This allows a single exhaust exit path from the center of the engine which aids packaging the unit into an outboard form factor. The compression ratio was also dropped to 9.6:1. Whilst not ideal from an efficiency standpoint, it does reduce heat and stress on the engine which increases durability; an essential attribute for marine duty. It also allows 87 octane rated fuels to be used.

The stroke remains the same, however the compression ratio is now 12.0:1. It also utilizes a gasoline direct injection system, a first for a 4-stroke outboard engine, and it requires 89 Octane rated fuel.

References

B8444S
Yamaha products
Gasoline engines by model
Automobile engines
V8 engines